Rocca is a village in Tuscany, central Italy, administratively a frazione of the comune of Borgo a Mozzano, province of Lucca.

Rocca is about 25 km from Lucca and 3 km from Borgo a Mozzano.

References

Bibliography

External links
 

Frazioni of the Province of Lucca